Morningside University is a private university affiliated with the United Methodist Church and located in Sioux City, Iowa. Founded in 1894 by the Methodist Episcopal Church, Morningside University has 21 buildings on a  campus in Sioux City (area population 143,157 in 2008.). The Morningside College Historic District, which includes most of the campus, is on the National Register of Historic Places. Morningside College officially became Morningside University on June 1, 2021.

History

A group of Sioux City business leaders and Methodist ministers established the University of the Northwest in 1889 to provide educational, cultural and economic growth in the community. The location of the campus was the northern section of the farm of Edwin C. Peters, the founder of the suburb of Morningside. The university was plagued with financial problems, and it became a victim of the financial Panic of 1893. It closed in 1894, the same year that the Methodist Episcopal Church incorporated Morningside College and took over the campus. Charles City College in Charles City, Iowa, was a German Methodist college that was absorbed into Morningside College in 1914.

Historic district
Part of the campus has been set aside in 1997 as a historic district listed on the National Register of Historic Places.  At the time of its nomination it contained 26 resources, which included nine contributing buildings, one contributing site, five contributing objects, nine non-contributing buildings, and one non-contributing object.  The focus of the district is a broad hilltop that overlooks the Missouri River valley. Charles City College Hall (1890), Lewis Hall (1900), the Vice President's House (pre-1914), Hickman-Johnson-Furrow Library (1914), Lillian Dimmitt House (1921), Dimmitt Residence Hall (1926), Jones Hall of Science (1948), Alice Gymnasium (1949), Roadman Hall (1953), and O'Donoghue Observatory (1953) are the contributing buildings. The contributing objects are The Spoonholder (1908), a curved cement bench with footpad and backrest; Class of 1922 Sundial; and the three Harmony Lane Lampposts. 

This is the largest concentration of educational buildings in Sioux City, and it also contains some of the best examples of Richardsonian Romanesque, Italianate, and Moderne architecture in the city. The district is also linked to the Morningside neighborhood, which was developed as a streetcar suburb. When the University of the Northwest was being developed, there was a conscious effort to pattern it and the neighborhood after Northwestern University and Evanston, Illinois.

Athletics
The Morningside athletic teams are called the Mustangs (formerly known as the "Maroon Chiefs"). The university is a member of the National Association of Intercollegiate Athletics (NAIA), primarily competing in the Great Plains Athletic Conference (GPAC) since the 2003–04 academic year. The Mustangs previously competed as an NAIA Independent during the 2002–03 school year; and in the defunct North Central Conference (NCC) from 1922–23 to 2001–02, which was affiliated in the NCAA Division II ranks.

Morningside competes in 27 intercollegiate varsity sports: Men's sports include baseball, basketball, bowling, cross country, football, golf, lacrosse, soccer, swimming, tennis, track & field, volleyball and wrestling; while women's sports include basketball, bowling, cross country, golf, lacrosse, soccer, softball, swimming, tennis, track & field and volleyball; and co-ed sports include cheerleading, dance and eSports.

Accomplishments
The Mustangs women's basketball team won back-to-back NAIA Division II National Championships in 2004 and 2005. They also won the National Championship in 2009 with an undefeated 38–0 record. Most recently, the Mustangs won the NAIA Division II Women's Basketball National Champsionship in 2015 with a 37–1 record. Morningside's Jake Stevenson won the NAIA  Wrestling Championship in 2007, and John Sievert won the  Championship in 2013.  The football team was coached from 1948–1950 by Pro Football Hall of Fame coach George Allen.

The current football coach is Steve Ryan.  In 2018, Ryan guided the Mustangs to an undefeated 15–0 season.  The team was named national champions after they captured the 2018 NAIA Football National Championship.  In 2019, the Mustangs again went undefeated, becoming back-to-back winners in the 2019 NAIA Football National Championship. Morningside continued their success in the fall of 2021 where they won the 2021 NAIA Football National Championship in Durham, North Carolina - their 3rd in four years.

The Morningside Mustangs dance team won their first national title in 2022. Their head coach is Alisha Knowler, who has been coaching the team for 5 years. The dance team also set a national record for highest score at a dance nationals with a 92.31.

Student life
Morningside University is on a  campus in the residential neighborhood of Morningside in Sioux City, Iowa. Student organizations include: student government, honor societies, service groups, religious organizations, musical ensembles, student publications, and three national fraternities ( Alpha Omicron Pi women's sorority, Delta Sigma Phi fraternity, and Acacia). The campus is also home to two nationally renowned music fraternities, Phi Mu Alpha Sinfonia (men's) and Mu Phi Epsilon (co-ed nationally, but strictly women for this campus). Morningside's Department of Mass Communications has a weekly newspaper, the Collegian Reporter, it shares a public-access television cable TV as MCTV, and operates a radio station 24 hours a day at 92.9 on the FM dial, KMSC, Fusion 93.

Residence halls

Dimmitt Hall is the third oldest building on campus. It was named for Lillian Dimmitt, the 26-year Dean of Women. Roadman Hall was built in the mid twentieth century. It houses about 150 students. The dormitory is named after Earl Roadman, president of the college from 1936 to 1956. In 2005, two apartment-style dormitories opened for upperclassmen, the Waitt and Poppen Halls. Lags Hall, a third apartment-style facility, was added in 2007.

Additions since 2005

In 2005, the Hickman Johnson Furrow Library was renovated and a central campus green space and new maintenance facilities were built for $26 million.

The first addition came in the form of the central campus Hilker Green Space. Work began in the Summer of 2006 and it opened in late Summer of 2007. The space is designed as a split-level area featuring the grand two-level Lieder Family Fountain. Walkways and a  access path cut through the upper-lawn making their way by Lewis Hall connecting the Hickman Johnson Furrow Learning and Olsen Student Centers. Near Eppley Auditorium, the Buhler Outdoor Performance Center was built.

A softball complex was added in Fall 2005.

Notable alumni

Shirley Booz, dancer and model
George Everett "Bud" Day, a retired colonel in the United States Air Force and recipient of the Medal of Honor.
Kory DeHaan, MLB outfielder
Anthony Fieldings, football player
Ira N. Gabrielson, first director of the U.S. Fish and Wildlife Service
Stanley L. Greigg,  member of the U.S. House of Representatives from northwestern Iowa
Matthew C. Harrison, 13th and current president of the Lutheran Church–Missouri Synod
Daryl Hecht, Justice of the Iowa Supreme Court
Jerry Johnson, football player
William G. Kirchner, Minnesota state legislator
Gayle Knief, football player
Utu Abe Malae, Gubernatorial Candidate for American Samoa.
Herb McMath, former NFL defensive tackle
Al McIntosh, editor who was featured in Ken Burns' The War
Emory Parnell, actor
Pauline Phillips and Eppie Lederer, identical twin sisters of the notable newspaper columns "Dear Abby" and "Ask Ann Landers", are Morningside College alumni.  Known as the "Friedman twins" during their time at Morningside, they wrote for the school's long-running newspaper, the Collegian Reporter
Cory Roberts, President, CEO, and Chairman of the board of Propath
Harry E. Siman, member of the Nebraska State Senate
Trent Solsma, football player
Paul Splittorff, baseball player
Samuel A. Stouffer, sociologist
Harry Webber, football player
Brandon Wegher, football player
Carl O. Wegner, Minnesota state legislator

References

External links

 
 Official athletics website

 
Universities and colleges affiliated with the United Methodist Church
Educational institutions established in 1894
Education in Sioux City, Iowa
1894 establishments in Iowa
Tourist attractions in Sioux City, Iowa
Great Plains Athletic Conference schools
Historic districts in Sioux City, Iowa
Historic districts on the National Register of Historic Places in Iowa
National Register of Historic Places in Woodbury County, Iowa
University and college buildings on the National Register of Historic Places in Iowa
Private universities and colleges in Iowa